Víctor Antonio Cancino Araneda (born 27 June 1972) is a Chilean former footballer.

Club career
born in Los Lagos, Cancino was signed by Deportes Puerto Montt from Real Valdivia in his native Los Lagos in the 1997 Primera División season.

Cancino also won a league title in 2004, playing at Universidad de Chile, and is an important player of Deportes Puerto Montt, former 90s team Real Valdivia and Santiago Wanderers, leaving in those teams a message of great effort.

International career
Cancino played in 2001 in the Chile national team under the orders of the coach Jorge Garcés. In addition, he made an appearance for Chile B in the friendly match against Catalonia on 28 December 2001.

Honours

Club
Universidad de Chile
 Primera División de Chile (1): 2004 Apertura

References

External links
 Víctor Cancino at Football-Lineups
 
 
 Víctor Cancino at MemoriaWanderers 

1972 births
Living people
People from Los Lagos Region
Chilean footballers
Chile international footballers
Deportes Valdivia footballers
Puerto Montt footballers
Deportes Concepción (Chile) footballers
Santiago Wanderers footballers
Universidad de Chile footballers
Coquimbo Unido footballers
Tercera División de Chile players
Primera B de Chile players
Chilean Primera División players
Association football midfielders
Chilean football managers